Rhytidothyra is a genus of land snails with an operculum, terrestrial gastropod mollusks in the family Pomatiidae.

Species 
Species within the genus Rhytidothyra include:
 Rhytidothyra bilabiata (d’Orbigny, 1842)
 Rhytidothyra jacobsoni Alcalde, 1948

References 

Pomatiidae